The following is a list of characters from the novel The Deer and the Cauldron by Jin Yong. Some of these characters previously appeared in another novel Sword Stained with Royal Blood, which is also written by Jin Yong. Some of these characters are based on historical figures, such as the Kangxi Emperor, Oboi, Wu Sangui, Chen Yuanyuan, Princess Changping, Zheng Keshuang, Feng Xifan, Shi Lang, Galdan Boshugtu Khan, Sophia Alekseyevna, Desi Sangye Gyatso, and Wu Liuqi, as well as Zha Jizuo, a purported ancestor of Jin Yong (Zha Liangyong).

Wei Xiaobao and his family 
 Wei Xiaobao is the witty, sly and illiterate protagonist who was born in a brothel in Yangzhou during the Qing dynasty. He bumbles his way into the imperial palace and has a fateful encounter with the young Kangxi Emperor, with whom he develops a friendship. By sheer luck and wit, he makes a series of accomplishments that have an impact on significant historical events during the Kangxi Emperor's reign.
 Wei Chunfang is Wei Xiaobao's mother and a prostitute from a brothel in Yangzhou.

The seven wives 
In order of appearance in the novel:
 Mu Jianping is Mu Jiansheng's younger sister and a princess of the House of Prince Mu. Due to a conflict between the House of Prince Mu and the Tiandihui, she is taken hostage by the Tiandihui and sent to the imperial palace to be placed under Wei Xiaobao's watch. Later, she is captured by the Mystic Dragon Cult and forced to join them. She is the second youngest and most naïve of the seven.
 Fang Yi is Liu Dahong's apprentice and a servant of the House of Prince Mu. She is initially in a romantic relationship with Liu Yizhou, who also serves the House of Prince Mu. After a failed assassination attempt on the Kangxi Emperor, she is wounded and forced to rely on Wei Xiaobao to keep her safe in the imperial palace. Wei Xiaobao then uses every opportunity to make advances on her and force her to promise to marry him if he saves Liu Yizhou, who has been captured by imperial guards. After committed she is to Liu Yizhou, Wei Xiaobao wavers between giving up on her and insisting that she keeps her promise. However, Fang Yi later ends her relationship with Liu Yizhou after seeing how cowardly he is, and decides she wants to be with Wei Xiaobao after realising that he is more trustworthy despite his flaws. At one point, she is captured by the Mystic Dragon Cult and forced to join them and lure Wei Xiaobao into traps. Wei Xiaobao manages to save her with Su Quan's help.
 Shuang'er is a servant of the Zhuang family of Huzhou and an apprentice of He Tishou. The matriarch tells her to follow Wei Xiaobao and serve him – as an expression of her gratitude to him for avenging their family by killing Oboi – and she initially serves as his bodyguard before becoming one of his wives. Among the seven, she is the youngest and the most loyal. At one point, she becomes sworn siblings with Wu Liuqi.
 Su Quan is Hong Antong's wife who is adept in using her beautiful looks to seduce men and bend them to her will. As Hong Antong had forced her to marry him, she harbours a grudge against him and has been trying to consolidate power within the cult by promoting younger members to replace the older ones who are more loyal to Hong Antong. As Hong Antong needs to refrain from having sex in order to master high-level inner energy skills, he has never consummated his marriage with Su Quan. Wei Xiaobao flatters and flirts with her during his first encounter with the Mystic Dragon Cult. Later, she disguises herself as a prostitute to lure Wei Xiaobao into a trap in a brothel, but he sees through her guise easily as she is unfamiliar with the ways of a brothel. He tricks her into drinking drugged wine, rendering her unconscious, and places her on the bed along with Fang Yi, Mu Jianping, Zeng Rou, Shuang'er and Ake; and randomly has sex with some of them. The next time she and Wei Xiaobao meet, her attitude is warmer, and it is later revealed that she is pregnant with his child. She decides to follow Wei after the Mystic Dragon Cult is destroyed in its internal conflict. She is the most powerful in martial arts and the oldest among the seven.
 Princess Jianning is a younger sister of the Kangxi Emperor. It turns out later that she is not related to the emperor because her biological mother is Mao Dongzhu, who has been impersonating the empress dowager. Of the seven wives, she is the most violent, sadistic, and spoiled. She loves Wei Xiaobao because he is the only one who dares to stand up to her, and she likes to engage in BDSM activities with him. When the Kangxi Emperor finds out that Jianning is not his real sister, he arranges for Jianning to be sent to Yunnan to marry Wu Yingxiong in a political marriage. Before the wedding, she drugs Wei Xiaobao, strips him naked, whips him, and tries to use candles to burn his hair. He gives in to her seductive advances and sleeps with her that night. The next day, Wei Xiaobao gives her one of the pistols he received from Wu Sangui as a gift. She tricks Wu Yingxiong into going into her room, points the pistol at him, and orders him to strip before castrating him. The marriage still proceeds as planned although Jianning continues to have an ongoing affair with Wei Xiaobao. She eventually reveals that she is pregnant with Wei Xiaobao's child and they elope. The Kangxi Emperor later issues a decree declaring that Jianning is Wei Xiaobao's formal spouse.
 Zeng Rou is from the Wangwu School. She attempts to assassinate Wei Xiaobao in a military camp and catches him off guard while he is gambling with some officers. However, Wei Xiaobao turns the gambling game to his advantage and outsmarts her by cheating in the game. He then lets them go and earns Zeng Rou's admiration and affection. Zeng Rou is the most polite and cultured among the seven.
 Ake is the daughter of Chen Yuanyuan. She has a crush on Zheng Keshuang previously but leaves him after he reveals his true colours. She is Wei Xiaobao's most beautiful wife.

The three children 
 Wei Shuangshuang is Wei Xiaobao's daughter and first child, born to Princess Jianning. Originally named "Bandeng", which means "wooden bench", her name was changed to "Shuangshuang" ("doubles") on Su Quan's suggestion.
 Wei Hutou is Wei Xiaobao's first son and second child, born to Ake. His name literally means "tiger head".
 Wei Tongchui is Wei Xiaobao's second son and third child, born to Su Quan. His name literally means "bronze hammer".

Qing Empire 
 The Kangxi Emperor is the ruler of the Qing Empire. First introduced as "Xiaoxuanzi", he forges a close friendship with Wei Xiaobao.
 The Empress Dowager is the Kangxi Emperor's stepmother. She was immobilised and imprisoned in a wardrobe in her room by Mao Dongzhu, who has been impersonating her until she is discovered and freed by Wei Xiaobao.

 Imperial court officials
 Oboi is one of the Four Regents who govern the Qing Empire when the Kangxi Emperor is still a child. With Wei Xiaobao's help, the emperor ousts Oboi from power and imprisons him. Wei Xiaobao later kills Oboi by accident.
 Prince Kang is a distant cousin of the Kangxi Emperor. He befriends Wei Xiaobao.
 Songgotu is Sonin's son who serves as Vice Minister of Personnel, First Class Imperial Guard, and Grand Secretary. He befriends Wei Xiaobao and becomes sworn brothers with him.
 Batai is the Minister of Rites and Grand Secretary of the Zhonghe Hall.
 Wei Zhouzuo is the Grand Secretary of the Baohe Hall.
 Mishan is the Minister of Revenue.
 Duikana is the Grand Secretary of the Wenhua Hall.
 Du Lide is a Grand Secretary.
 Tuhai is a Grand Secretary.
 Mingju is the Minister of War.
 Jelken is the Vice Minister of Rites.
 Daerli is the Secretary of the Hanlin Academy.
 Moluo is the Minister of Justice.
 Li Wei is a Grand Secretary.
 Isangga is the Minister of Personnel.
 Li Lei is the Minister of Revenue and Grand Secretary of the Baohe Hall.
 Tong Guogang is a First Class Duke and Han commander of the Bordered Yellow Banner. He is also the Kangxi Emperor's maternal uncle.
 Ledehong
 Feng Pu
 Wang Xi
 Huang Ji
 Wu Zhengzhi
 Zong Deyi
 Adam Schall von Bell
 Ferdinand Verbiest

 Imperial guards
 Duolong is the Supervisor of the Imperial Guards and a close friend of Wei Xiaobao. At one point, Wei reluctantly kills him in order to save the Tiandihui members who are under siege by imperial guards. It turns out later that he has survived and does not know that Wei had attempted to kill him earlier.
 Ruidong, nicknamed "Undefeated Iron Palm", is the Deputy Supervisor of the Imperial Guards. Mao Dongzhu sends him to kill Wei Xiaobao but Wei outsmarts him and kills him.
 Chaerzhu is a cavalry commander of the Plain Yellow Banner.
 Zhang Kangnian
 Zhao Qixian
 Shi Laoliu is killed by Mao Dongzhu.
 Xiong Laoer is killed by Mao Dongzhu.
 Ge Tong is killed by the Wangwu Sect members.
 Captain Gua is killed by Chen Jinnan.
 Shi Song, nicknamed "Black Dragon Whip", tries to arrest Mao Shiba. Wei Xiaobao kills him and saves Mao Shiba.
 Fuchun is a cavalry officer.
 Ajichi is a vanguard commander.
 Commander Tai is a vanguard officer.

 Eunuchs and palace maids
 Hai Dafu is a fifth class eunuch serving as deputy supervisor of the imperial kitchen. He is also a martial arts expert of the Kongtong School and has received a secret mission from the Shunzhi Emperor to investigate Consort Donggo's death. He kidnaps Wei Xiaobao and brings him into the imperial palace. Later, he is killed by Mao Dongzhu in a fight after confirming his suspicion that she murdered Consort Donggo.
 Xiaoguizi is a young eunuch serving under Hai Dafu. Wei Xiaobao kills him and impersonates him and continues serving under Hai Dafu.
 Eunuch Wu is in charge of the imperial study.
 Wen Youdao and Wen Youfang are eunuchs serving in the imperial study.
 Pingwei
 Ruichu is Mao Dongzhu's personal handmaiden.
 Dong Jinkui is a eunuch serving as Mao Dongzhu's messenger. He is killed by Wei Xiaobao.

 Defectors from Tungning
 Shi Lang is a naval officer of Tungning. After the Tungning ruler Zheng Jing executes his family, he defects to the Qing Empire and meets Wei Xiaobao, who recommends him as a talent to the Kangxi Emperor because of his expertise in naval warfare. He leads the Qing navy against Tungning during the Battle of Penghu.
 Lin Xingzhu
 Hong Chao
 He You

 Others
 Wu Zhirong is the governor of Yangzhou. He played a key role in the massacre of the Zhuang family of Huzhou many years ago. Shuang'er recognises him and begs Wei Xiaobao to help her avenge her family. Wei then frames him for collaborating with Wu Sangui and has him arrested and sent to Huzhou, where he is killed by the widows of the Zhuang family.
 Jiang Baisheng is a military officer serving under Prince Kang.
 Huang Fu is a naval officer.
 Zhao Liangdong is a military officer who leads Qing forces to suppress Wu Sangui's rebellion. He becomes Viceroy of Yun-Gui and Minister of War later.
 Ma You is a governor.
 Mu Tianyan is a chief secretary.
 Lergiyen is a prince and general who leads Qing forces to suppress Wu Sangui's rebellion.
 Zhang Yong is a provincial military commander in Yunnan.
 Wang Jinbao is a military officer stationed in Yunnan.
 Sun Sike is a military officer stationed in Yunnan.
 Major General Peng is a military officer stationed on the island where Wei Xiaobao goes into self-exile.
 Vice Admiral Lu is Shi Lang's deputy.
 Bahai is a general stationed in Ningguta.
 Sabusu is a general stationed in Heilongjiang.
 Vice Admiral Ban oversees the construction of naval weapons.
 Pengchun
 Mala
 Langtan
 Aerni
 Ma Qi

 Characters mentioned by name only
 The Grand Empress Dowager is the Kangxi Emperor's grandmother.
 Consort Donggo was the Shunzhi Emperor's favourite concubine who was murdered by Mao Dongzhu.
 Consort Zhen was Consort Donggo's younger sister who was also murdered by Mao Dongzhu.
 Empress Xiaokangzhang was the Kangxi Emperor's biological mother who was murdered by Mao Dongzhu.
 Suksaha is one of the Four Regents who govern the Qing Empire when the Kangxi Emperor is still a child. He is framed for treason by Oboi and executed.
 Chakedan is Suksaha's son who is executed along with his father.
 Sonin is one of the Four Regents and Songgotu's father.
 Ebilun is one of the Four Regents.
 Hechabo is the commander of the Bordered Red Banner.
 Tong Tulai was the father of Empress Xiaokangzhang and Tong Guogang, and the maternal grandfather of the Kangxi Emperor.
 Fudeng is the commander of the Plain Blue Banner.
 Jiakun is the former commander of the Plain Blue Banner.
 Eshuoke is the commander of the Bordered Blue Banner.
 Yang Guangxian is an official in the Bureau of Astronomy.
 Gan Wenkun is the Viceroy of Yun-Gui.
 Zhu Guozhi is the governor of Yunnan.
 Zhang Guogui is the provincial military commander of Yunnan.
 Cao Shenji is the governor of Guizhou.
 Li Benshen is the provincial military commander of Guizhou.
 Lu Yifeng is the magistrate of Jing County.

Tiandihui 

The Tiandihui is a secret society aiming to overthrow the Manchu-led Qing Empire and restore Han Chinese in China. It has many branches (lodges) spread throughout China. Wei Xiaobao becomes the master of Greenwood Lodge by chance.

 Chen Jinnan, based on the historical figure Chen Yonghua, is the founder of the Tiandihui. He was formerly an adviser to Zheng Chenggong and has been a subject of the Kingdom of Tungning. By chance, he meets Wei Xiaobao, takes him in as his apprentice and teaches him martial arts. He is killed by Zheng Keshuang.
 Wu Liuqi, nicknamed "Iron Beggar", is a member of the Beggars' Sect who was influenced by Zha Yihuang to secretly join the Tiandihui. Outside the Tiandihui, he serves as a provincial military commander in Guangdong. At one point, he becomes sworn siblings with Shuang'er. He is killed by the Gui family in a fight.

 Other lodge masters
 Cai Dezhong is the master of Lotus Lodge.
 Fang Dahong is the master of Hongshun Lodge.
 Ma Chaoxing is the master of Jiahou Lodge.
 Hu Dedi is the master of Cantai Lodge.
 Li Shikai is the master of Honghua Lodge.
 Gu Zhizhong is the master of Red Fire Lodge.
 Lin Yongchao is the master of Icy Lodge.
 Yao Bida is the master of Yellow Earth Lodge.

 Members of Greenwood Lodge
 Qi Qingbiao is nicknamed "Qi the Third".
 Cui Xiazi
 Guan Anji is nicknamed "Master Guan".
 Jia Jindao is Jia Laoliu's sister and Guan Anji's wife.
 Xu Tianchuan, nicknamed "Eight Armed Ape", serves as a spy for the Tiandihui.
 Li Lishi
 Taoist Xuanzhen
 Gao Yanchao
 Qian Laoben
 Fan Gang
 Feng Jizhong is a spy planted in the Tiandihui by the Kangxi Emperor. He secretly reports their activities to the emperor, including Wei Xiaobao's identity as one of its lodge masters. After Chen Jinnan dies, he reveals his true identity to Wei Xiaobao and tries to persuade Wei to help the emperor destroy the Tiandihui, but Wei refuses. He is shot to death by Shuang'er.
 Jia Laoliu

 Others
 Mao Shiba is an outlaw whom Wei Xiaobao encounters and saves in Yangzhou. Mao Shiba then brings Wei Xiaobao to Beijing, where both of them are kidnapped by Hai Dafu and brought into the imperial palace. He manages to escape, joins the Tiandihui and reunites with Wei Xiaobao when the latter becomes a lodge master of the Tiandihui. Later, when the Kangxi Emperor forces Wei Xiaobao to destroy the Tiandihui, Mao Shiba accuses Wei Xiaobao of being a traitor. Mao Shiba is captured and sentenced to death but Wei Xiaobao saves him by secretly making him switch places with Feng Xifan.
 Wu Dapeng is nicknamed "Cloud Touching Hand".
 Wang Tan is nicknamed "Mountain Splitting Twin Brushes".
 Shu Hualong
 Kuang Tianxiong

Kingdom of Tungning 

The Kingdom of Tungning was founded by Zheng Chenggong, a loyalist of the fallen Ming Empire who wrestled control of Taiwan from the Dutch East India Company and planned to use Taiwan as a base of operations to restore the Ming Empire in mainland China.

 Zheng Keshuang is Zheng Jing's second son and heir to the throne of Tungning. Ake, who initially has a crush on him, gives up on him after seeing his true colours. After the Tungning defeat at the Battle of Penghu, Zheng Keshuang surrenders to the Qing Empire and receives a ducal title. Although Zheng Keshuang is a young adult in the novel, the historical Zheng Keshuang was about 12 years old when Tungning was conquered by the Qing Empire.
 Feng Xifan, nicknamed "One Sword Thrust That Draws No Blood", is a formidable swordsman from the Kunlun School and Zheng Keshuang's martial arts master.
 Feng Xifan's household
 Jufang is Feng's concubine.
 Lanxiang is Feng's servant.
 Xing Si is Feng's stable keeper.

 Characters mentioned by name only
 Zheng Chenggong, also known as Koxinga and the Prince of Yanping, was the founder of the Kingdom of Tungning.
 Dong You was Zheng Chenggong's wife and Zheng Jing's mother.
 Zheng Jing was Zheng Chenggong's son and the ruler of the Kingdom of Tungning.
 Zheng Kezang was Zheng Jing's first son who was killed by Feng Xifan.
 Liu Guoxuan
 Zhou Quanbin
 Gan Hui
 Ma Xin

Characters associated with the fallen Ming Empire 

 Jiunan is a Buddhist nun who is the former Princess Changping, a daughter of the Chongzhen Emperor, the last emperor of the Ming Empire. She is a prominent character in Sword Stained with Royal Blood. In this novel, she kidnapped the baby Ake and raised and trained her with the intention of using her to take revenge against those responsible for the fall of the Ming Empire. She meets Wei Xiaobao and takes him as an apprentice.
 Aqi is Jiunan's apprentice and Ake's senior. She marries Galdan later.
 Li Zicheng, nicknamed "Dashing King", was the leader of the rebel forces that overthrew the Ming Empire. He has gone into hiding in Yunnan after the Qing Empire replaced the Ming Empire.
 Chen Yuanyuan is Wu Sangui's concubine and Ake's mother.
 Tao Hongying is a palace maid who served Princess Changping. She continues to work in the imperial palace after the Qing Empire replaced the Ming Empire. Her martial arts master ordered her to steal the "Sutra of Forty-two Chapters".
 Li Xihua is the son of Li Yan and the Red Maiden, who were former subordinates of Li Zicheng. He attempts to kill Li Zicheng to avenge his parents whom Li Zicheng forced to commit suicide.

 Characters mentioned by name only
 Third Prince Zhu is a son of the Chongzhen Emperor and a pretender to the Ming throne supported by the Tiandihui.
 Fifth Prince Zhu is a son of Zhu Youlang and a pretender to the Ming throne supported by the House of Prince Mu.
 Zhu Shugui, the Prince of Ningjing, is a pretender to the Ming throne who took shelter in the Kingdom of Tungning. He commits suicide after Tungning surrenders to the Qing Empire.
 Li Yan was Li Xihua's father and a character in Sword Stained With Royal Blood.
 The Red Maiden was Li Xihua's mother and a character in Sword Stained With Royal Blood.

House of Prince Mu 
The House of Prince Mu is a noble family based in Yunnan. Their ancestor is Mu Ying, who was made a prince by the Hongwu Emperor of the Ming Empire. After the Qing Empire replaced the Ming Empire, the House of Prince Mu and their servants continue to operate as an underground resistance movement against Wu Sangui and Qing forces stationed in Yunnan.

 Mu Jiansheng is the head of the Mu family and Mu Jianping's elder brother.
 Liu Dahong, nicknamed "Iron-Backed Dragon", is Fang Yi's martial arts master and a servant of the Mu family.
 Wu Lishen, nicknamed "Head-Shaking Lion", is a servant of the Mu family. Along with Fang Yi, his two apprentices and others, he attempts to assassinate the Kangxi Emperor and push the blame to Wu Sangui. However, the attempt fails and he is captured along with his apprentices and tortured in prison. Wei Xiaobao later helps them escape and earns the gratitude of the Mu family, thereby resolving the conflict between them and the Tiandihui.
 Ao Biao is Wu Lishen's apprentice.
 Liu Yizhou is Wu Lishen's apprentice. He is initially in a romantic relationship with Fang Yi. Later, out of cowardice, he betrays his fellows and Wei Xiaobao.
 Su Gang, nicknamed "Sacred Hand Resident", is a servant of the Mu family and Bai Hanfeng's sworn brother.
 Bai Hanfeng is a servant of the Mu family. After his brother is killed in a misunderstanding by Xu Tianchuan of the Tiandihui, he brings his fellows to seek vengeance on the Tiandihui. Wei Xiaobao resolves the conflict between the Mu family and the Tiandihui after helping Wu Lishen, Ao Biao and Liu Yizhou escape from captivity.
 Bai Hansong was Bai Hanfeng's elder brother who was killed by Xu Tianchuan in a misunderstanding.

Mystic Dragon Cult 
The Mystic Dragon Cult is a cult and martial arts school based on Mystic Dragon Island, a fictional island located off the coast of Northeast China. They are known for using poison-based martial arts. Wei Xiaobao becomes one of the cult's five emissaries by flattering Hong Antong. Later, he stirs up internal conflict within the cult and destroys it with the help of imperial forces.

 Hong Antong is the cult leader and a formidable martial artist. A cruel and ruthless man, he enjoys hearing his followers shower him with words of flattery. As Hong Antong has been treating his followers harshly and has incurred much resentment from them, Wei Xiaobao is able to easily provoke them into rebelling against their leader, thereby stirring up internal conflict within the cult. Hong Antong dies of exhaustion after a one-against-four fight with Xu Yunting, Zhang Danyue, Taoist Wugen and the Fat Monk.
 Xu Yunting is the cult's Green Dragon Emissary who specialises in using a brush to execute dianxue techniques.
 Zhang Danyue is the cult's Black Dragon Emissary who specialises in using a pair of short swords.
 Yin Jin is the cult's Yellow Dragon Emissary who is glib-tongued but not good in martial arts.
 Taoist Wugen is the cult's Red Dragon Emissary.
 Zhong Zhiling was the cult's former White Dragon Emissary who was assassinated. Wei Xiaobao replaces him as the White Dragon Emissary.
 The Fat Monk was once fat but gradually shrunk in size and becomes thin after being poisoned by Hong Antong.
 The Thin Monk is the Fat Monk's counterpart and Mao Dongzhu's lover. He is killed by the Gui family.
 Mao Dongzhu is Mao Wenlong's daughter. Sent by the cult to infiltrate the imperial palace and impersonate the empress dowager, she once taught the Kangxi Emperor martial arts when he was still a boy. After her cover is blown, she flees the imperial palace and is eventually killed by the Gui family.
 Liu Yan is Mao Dongzhu's junior who is also sent by the cult to infiltrate the imperial palace. She disguises herself as a palace maid serving under Mao Dongzhu, who impersonates the empress dowager. At one point, Mao Dongzhu orders her to escort Wei Xiaobao to his residence to retrieve copies of the "Sutra of Forty-two Chapters", and she is killed by Fang Yi.
 Deng Bingchun is killed by Wei Xiaobao.
 Lu Gaoxuan
 Yun Sumei
 Zhang Laosan

Wu Sangui and associates 

 Wu Sangui, the Prince Who Pacifies the West, is a former general of the Ming Empire who defected to the Manchus during the Battle of Shanhai Pass. After the Manchus established the Qing Empire, they rewarded him with a princedom in Yunnan. During the Kangxi Emperor's reign, he starts a rebellion against the Qing Empire.
 Wu Yingxiong is Wu Sangui's son. The Kangxi Emperor arranges for a marriage between Wu Yingxiong and Princess Jianning in a bid to put Wu Sangui off guard and buy time to prepare countermeasures in case Wu Sangui rebelled. The emperor also appoints Wei Xiaobao as an imperial commissioner to escort the princess to Yunnan and oversee the wedding. However, Jianning refuses to marry Wu Yingxiong and castrates him and accuses him of molesting her. Wu Yingxiong is later sent to the capital as a hostage to ensure that his father remains loyal to the Qing Empire. He is executed when his father starts a rebellion.
 Xia Guoxiang is Wu Sangui's son-in-law and chancellor of the Yunnan princedom. He is tricked by Wei Xiaobao into releasing the assassin who made an attempt on Wu Sangui's life.
 Ma Bao is a general serving under Wu Sangui.
 Yang Yizhi is a military officer serving under Wu Sangui and an attendant to Wu Yingxiong. An honourable man who remains loyal to the Qing Empire despite serving under Wu Sangui, he becomes sworn brothers with Wei Xiaobao at one point. Later, Wu Sangui has Yang Yizhi arrested on false charges and Yang Yizhi ends up being mutilated into a "human swine" and suffering a torturous death.
 Balangxing is Wu Sangui's bodyguard.

 Characters mentioned by name only
 Geng Jingzhong, the Prince of Jingnan, is stationed in Fujian. He is involved in the Revolt of the Three Feudatories against the Qing Empire.
 Shang Zhixin, the Prince Who Pacifies the South, is stationed in Guangdong. He is involved in the Revolt of the Three Feudatories.
 Sun Yanling is a general stationed in Guangxi who participates in the Revolt of the Three Feudatories.
 Kong Sizhen is Sun Yanling's wife who is also involved in the Revolt of the Three Feudatories.

Tsardom of Russia 

 Sophia is a Russian princess who becomes regent of Russia with Wei Xiaobao's help.
 (Vasily) Golitsyn is the Russian principal minister of state.
 (Alexei) Tolbuzin is a Russian general who argues with Wei Xiaobao over the border between the Qing Empire and Russia.
 Fyodor Golovin is a Russian envoy to the Qing Empire.
 Yarchinsky is the Russian governor of Nerchinsk and Jaxa.
 Waboski and Zironov are Sophia's bodyguards.

 Characters mentioned by name only
 Aleksey Mikhaylovich was the former Tsar and father of Feodor, Peter, Ivan and Sophia.
 Feodor III was Aleksey Mikhaylovich's son and successor as Tsar.
 Peter I is Feodor's half-brother and successor as Tsar.
 Ivan is Peter's half-brother who co-rules with him as Tsar.
 Natalia is Aleksey Mikhaylovich's second wife and Peter's mother. She is killed by the troops who defected to Sophia.

Shaolin School 

 Huicong is the abbot of Shaolin Monastery.
 Chengxin is the head of the Bodhidharma Hall and chief of the "Eighteen Arhats of Shaolin".
 Chengguan is the head of the Prajna Hall. An elderly monk in his 80s, he is manipulated by Wei Xiaobao to help him think of ways to speed-learn martial arts.
 Chengshi is the head of the Discipline Hall.
 Chengtong
 Chengjue
 Jingji
 Jingqing
 Jingben
 Jingyuan

Mount Wutai 
 Chengguang is a Shaolin monk who also serves as the abbot of Qingliang Monastery on Mount Wutai.
 Xingchi is the former Shunzhi Emperor and the Kangxi Emperor's father. He disappeared mysteriously after the death of his favourite concubine, Consort Donggo, and was presumed dead until it is discovered that he has become a monk in Qingliang Monastery on Mount Wutai. He is temporarily reunited with his son with Wei Xiaobao's help, but decides to permanently detach himself from worldly affairs and continue to be a monk.
 Xingdian is Xingchi's junior who was formerly a Supervisor of the Imperial Guards before he became a monk.
 Yulin is the master of Xingchi and Xingdian.
 Fasheng succeeds Chengguang as the abbot of Qingliang Monastery and later becomes the abbot of Ciyun Monastery in Chang'an.
 Xinxi is the abbot of Foguang Monastery on Mount Wutai.

Wangwu School 
The Wangwu School is a martial arts school founded by Situ Bolei, a former subordinate of Wu Sangui when the latter was still guarding Shanhai Pass as a general of the Ming Empire. After Wu Sangui defected to the Qing Empire, Situ Bolei and the men who were still loyal to the Ming Empire decided to leave. They settled down on Mount Wangwu, where Situ Bolei started the Wangwu School to resist the Qing Empire. After Situ Bolei's death, the remaining Wangwu School members joined the Tiandihui.

 Situ Bolei was the founder of the Wangwu School. Wu Sangui sent Balangxing to find Situ Bolei and persuade him to join him in Yunnan. When Situ Bolei refused, Balangxing killed him and cut off his head.
 Situ He is Situ Bolei's son.
 Taoist Wufu
 Yuan Yifang

Mongols 

 Galdan is a Mongol prince who allies with Wu Sangui when the latter rebels against the Qing Empire. He initially blames Wei Xiaobao for the failure of the revolt but is later deceived by Wei into believing that Wu Sangui betrayed him. He becomes sworn brothers with Wei and Sangye later.
 Hantiemo is an envoy sent by Galdan to meet Wu Sangui. Wei Xiaobao tricks him into describing the full plans of Wu Sangui's rebellion and then arrests him and sends him to the Kangxi Emperor.

Tibetans 

 Sangye is a guardian of the Dalai Lama and a highly-skilled martial artist. He becomes sworn brothers with Wei Xiaobao and Galdan.
 Bayan is a lama trusted by the Dalai Lama. He is sent to Mount Wutai to find the Shunzhi Emperor.
 Hubayin is Sangye's junior. He is killed by Wei Xiaobao.
 Changqi

 Characters mentioned by name only
 The Dalai Lama 
 Shengluotuo is a lama based in Pusading.
 Dahe'er is a lama based in Beijing.

Mount Hua School

 Gui Xinshu, nicknamed "Invincible Divine Fists", is a member of the Mount Hua School who also appears in Sword Stained with Royal Blood. He is killed along with his family by imperial guards.
 Gui Erniang is Gui Xinshu's wife who also appears in Sword Stained with Royal Blood.
 Gui Zhong is Gui Xinshu and Gui Erniang's son who first appeared in Sword Stained with Royal Blood as a sickly infant and has grown up to become a young adult.
 Feng Nandi, nicknamed "All Prestigious", is the leader of the Mount Hua School.
 Feng Bupo and Feng Bucui, nicknamed "Heroes of the Two Rivers", are Feng Nandi's sons.

 Characters mentioned by name only
 He Tishou saved the female members of the Zhuang family from exile and taught them martial arts.

Scholars 
 Lü Liuliang is a scholar who explains the meanings of the "deer" and the "cauldron" to his son in the opening chapter.
 Lü Baozhong and Lü Yizhong are Lü Liuliang's sons.
 Huang Zongxi
 Gu Yanwu

Zhuang family 

Zhuang Tinglong was a merchant from Huzhou who sponsored the publication of an unauthorised history of the Ming Empire. The book contained a number of inappropriate references to the Ming Empire, along with text considered taboo and defamatory to the Qing Empire. The Qing government, then led by the regent Oboi, heard about the book and ordered an investigation, leading to the arrests of many people associated with the book, including Zhuang Tinglong's family, the book's publishers, those who possessed copies of the book, and officials who failed to report the book. In the end, the thousands of people who were involved or implicated in the case were rounded up and punished accordingly – 72 of them were executed.

 The Third Young Mistress Zhuang is the matriarch of the Zhuang family. After the men in the Zhuang family were executed, the women were exiled to Ningguta. Along the way to Ningguta, the women were saved by He Tishou, who trained them in martial arts. They returned to their residence in Huzhou and pretended to be ghosts to scare away trespassers. After learning that Wei Xiaobao has killed Oboi and avenged the men in their family, the Third Young Mistress Zhuang feels grateful to him that she orders Shuang'er to follow Wei Xiaobao and serve him.

 Characters mentioned by name only
 Zhuang Tinglong
 Zhuang Yuncheng was Zhuang Tinglong's father who had the book published and distributed. He died of abuse and torture while he was imprisoned.

Others 
 Hu Yizhi, nicknamed "Hundred Victorious Saber King" and "Handsome Saber King", is a swordsman who has a crush on Chen Yuanyuan for many years. He follows Chen Yuanyuan to Yunnan and disguises himself so that he can protect her from danger. He meets Wei Xiaobao and becomes sworn brothers with him.
 Zha Yihuang, also known as Zha Jizuo, is a scholar from Haining. This character is purportedly an ancestor of the novel's author Jin Yong, whose birth name is Zha Liangyong.
 Ma Boren is the leader of the Tantui School who was invited to be a witness during the dispute between Xu Tianchuan and Bai Hanfeng.
 Lei Yixiao, nicknamed "Tiger-Faced Hegemon King", was invited to be a witness during the dispute between Xu Tianchuan and Bai Hanfeng.
 Wu Tong, nicknamed "Golden Spear King", is the leader of the Wusheng Security Service. He was invited to be a witness during the dispute between Xu Tianchuan and Bai Hanfeng.
 Shenzhao Shangren is a martial artist hired by Prince Kang.
 Qi Yuankai is a martial artist hired by Prince Kang. He stole Prince Kang's copy of the "Sutra of Forty-Two Chapters".
 Master Lang is a martial artist hired by Prince Kang.
 Yu Ba, nicknamed "One Stroke Less", is the administrator of Jixiang Temple in Fuping County.
 Yao Chun is a physician who was invited to be a witness during the dispute between Xu Tianchuan and Bai Hanfeng.
 Huangfu Ge is a scholar from Sichuan.

 Characters mentioned by name only
 Dugu Qiubai
 Linghu Chong
 Taoist Yunyan is from the Wudang School.
 Taoist Yunhe is Taoist Yunyan's senior.
 Song San, nicknamed "Swift Horse", is a friend of the Mu family.

See also 
 List of organisations in wuxia fiction

Lists of Jin Yong characters
The Deer and the Cauldron